江北, meaning "north of the river", may refer to:

In the Mandarin Chinese reading Jiāngběi
All areas of China north of the Yangtze River
Jiangbei District, Chongqing, People's Republic of China (north of the Jialing and Yangtze Rivers)
Jiangbei District, Ningbo, Zhejiang, People's Republic of China (north of the Yong River)
Jiangbei, Meizhou, Guangdong, People's Republic of China (north of the Mei River)

In the Korean reading Gangbuk, also spelled Kangbuk:
Gangbuk-gu, Seoul, South Korea (north of the Han River)

In the Japanese on-yomi Kōhoku
Kōhoku, Saga, Japan (north of the Rokkaku River)
Kōhoku, Adachi, Tokyo, Japan (north of the Arakawa River)

See also
Northern and southern China